Italian Paraguayans are one of the most prominent ethnic minorities in Paraguay, consisting mainly of Italian residents who migrated to Paraguay or Paraguayan-born citizens of Italian descent. Italian immigration to Paraguay has been one of the largest migration flows this South American country has received. 

Italians in Paraguay are the second-largest immigrant group in the country after the Spaniards. The Italian embassy calculates that nearly 40% of the Paraguayans have recent and distant Italian roots: about 2,500,000 Paraguayans are descendants of Italian emigrants to Paraguay. Over the years, many descendants of Italian immigrants came to occupy important positions in the public life of the country, such as the presidency of the republic, the vice-presidency, local administrations and congress.

History

During colonial centuries only a few Italians went to Paraguay; mostly were catholic missionaries, but there were also some merchants and a few soldiers under Spanish rule.

The War of the Triple Alliance (1865–70) was the bloodiest in Latin American history. The war was a disaster for Paraguay, which lost two-thirds of the adult male population. Paraguay's population fell from about 600,000 to about 250,000. For the next 50 years, Paraguay stagnated economically. The male population was replaced by an influx of immigrants from Italy, Spain, Germany, and Argentina. The census of 1899 showed a population of about 630,000 of whom nearly 100,000 were Indians. The foreign population in 1895 numbered 5,000 Argentines, 3,500 Italians, 1,500 Spaniards, 1,250 Germans, 800 French, 600 Brazilians, and 1000 Swiss, Austrians, English, and other nationalities.

 
At the end of the 19th century, numerous families of Italian immigrants arrived, most of Sicilian origin, who founded the Trinacria neighborhood ("Trinacria" is one of the ancient names of Sicily), in the Villa del Rosario district. Later they settled in the capital's quarters of General Díaz and Tacumbú. The Italians were a relatively huge community of nearly 6,000 people at the beginning of the 20th century, concentrated in the capital and the surrounding areas. This group of immigrants, largely made up of workers, architects, engineers and less by professionals in other fields, exercised great influence, especially on growth and urban development in Asunción and in the maintenance of the Paraguayan rail system. They created even small cities, like "Nuova Italia".

One of the most famous in the early 20th century was Silvio Pettirossi, who was a Paraguayan airplane pilot and aviation pioneer. In December 1914, he founded the Aeroclub de Paraguay and was named its president. Actually Asunción's Silvio Pettirossi International Airport, three soccer clubs, the "Airborne Brigade of the Paraguayan Air Force", a Paraguayan Air Force Base in Luque, an avenue in Asunción and the "Paraguayan Institute of Aviation History" are named after him.

During the Chaco War, the Italians actively participated against Bolivia and some Italian aviators, recently immigrated from Italy, were instrumental in the final victory of Paraguay. Various Presidents of Paraguay are Italo-paraguayans such as José Patricio Guggiari, Andrés Rodríguez Pedotti, Juan Carlos Wasmosy Monti and Luis Ángel González Macchi
 
40 percent of Paraguayans are descendants from the Italian immigrants. the Italians were 15% of the male population in Paraguay in 1875, after the Chaco War, but grew considerable in numbers with their offspring with local women, and now are fully assimilated due to many mixed marriages.

Migration history 

The number of Italian immigrants in Paraguay was by far the highlight of foreigners who settled in the country in the early postwar years after 1870. During the Paraguayan War, many Italian immigrants enlisted voluntarily rows of then President Mariscal Francisco Solano López.

In the period between 1882 and 1907, Italians were the largest group, exceeding 27% of total foreign arrivals in Paraguay.

After the unification of Italy in 1860, after Garibaldi's battles, began the era of the great migrations that lasted until 1914. This yielded a very extensive migratory movement, between the years 1869-1913, more than 14 million Italians left their country.

However, most of the Italian immigrants came mainly from Lombardy (especially from Bergamo) and the rest of northern Italy, comprising individuals who arrived in Paraguay on their own and facing its risks.

This group of immigrants, largely made up of workers, architects, engineers and less by professionals in other fields, exercised great influence, especially on growth and urban development in Asunción and in the maintenance of the Paraguayan rail system.

Culture

Starting with the Italian explorer Sebastian Cabot, in 1528, Italians in Paraguay have had a significant importance in the birth of modern Paraguay. Responsible for much of Paraguay's cultural heritage, both tangible and intangible, their sphere of influence has cut through nearly every aspect of society. Thanks to the Italians, Paraguayan cities acquired their current character through the settlement of those typical activities of a city: bakeries, shoe shops, tailors, pasta shops, liquor stores, among others.

Architecture 
The work of Italian engineers and architects transformed the colonial architecture of Paraguay, giving it an Italianate character, which is still visible today. 19th century were the architects Alejandro Ravizza and Juan Colombo, as well as the builders Giacomo Colombino and José Pelozzi. The builder David Broggini and the altar painter César Pizzoli were involved in the parish churches of Itauguá and Villarrica.

Festa Italiana 

Since 2017, the Festa Italiana ("Italian Feast") is an annual festival in the capital of Paraguay, with a huge success of public and commerce merchants. The feast is centered on Italian music and food and wine, and involves Italian cuisine restaurants and bars, as well as Italian Paraguayan associations, each with its own stand.

Cuisine 

The milanesa was brought to Paraguay by Italian immigrants during the mass emigration that created the Italian diaspora between 1860 and the 1920s. Its name probably reflects an original Milanese preparation, cotoletta alla milanese, which is similar to the Austrian Wiener schnitzel. Panettone, another food of Italian gastronomy brought by Italian immigrants, is also widespread in Paraguay.

The noquis del 29 ("gnocchi of 29") defines the widespread custom in some South American countries of eating a plate of gnocchi, a type of Italian pasta, on the 29th of each month. The custom is widespread especially in the states of the Southern Cone such as Brazil, Argentina, Paraguay, Uruguay; these countries being recipients of a considerable Italian immigration between the end of the 19th century and the beginning of the 20th century. There is a ritual that accompanies lunch with gnocchi, namely putting money under the plate which symbolizes the desire for new gifts. It is also customary to leave a banknote or coin under the plate to attract luck and prosperity to the dinner.

The tradition of serving gnocchi on the 29th of each month stems from a legend based on the story of Saint Pantaleon, a young doctor from Nicomedia who, after converting to Christianity, made a pilgrimage through northern Italy. There Pantaleon practiced miraculous cures for which he was canonized. According to legend, on one occasion when he asked Venetian peasants for bread, they invited him to share their poor table. In gratitude, Pantaleon announced a year of excellent fishing and excellent harvests. That episode occurred on 29 July, and for this reason that day is remembered with a simple meal represented by gnocchi.

Agriculture 
Italian immigrants introduced the cultivation of vegetable varieties to Paraguay, such as tomatoes, locotes, beets, cabbage, among others. Around 1920 at Itauguá, in the Estanzuela company, owned by Italians, strawberries began to be sown, which from that moment on was also produced in Paraguay.

Sport 

The Italian community of Asunción has had a great influence on Club Libertad. Precisely, the symbol of the sports club is Don Nicola, a character dressed as a greengrocer carrying a basket of produce from the garden, among which cabbages stand out. Don Nicola, with his broad mustache and checkered cap, represents Italian immigrants who used to cultivate vegetable gardens in their homes. This passionate and mustachioed Italian is nicknamed Gumarelo, a term that will forever identify the fan of Club Libertad.

As for the origin of the name Gumarelo, there are two versions. The first says that it originated from an Italian fictional character, created by the Argentine journalist Antonio Franiecevich in 1919 and 1920, who he called Pascuale Gummarello. Franiecevich himself has stated that he is a big fan of Club Libertad. The second version refers to the fact that the name derives from the surnames of two fans of Italian origin who were very fanatical about the club, Angel Giummarresi and Luis Nuzzarello, whose surnames, fused together, gave shape to the word "Gumarrello", which apparently, according to chronicle of the time, is also a Neapolitan dialect word.

Actual Italian community 

It is estimated by academics that about 2,500,000 Paraguayans have Italian ancestry, corresponding to 37%-40% of the total Paraguayan population. Italians are now fully integrated into Paraguayan society, due to the many marriages between Italians and Paraguayan girls (after the massacres in the war of 1870 that left only a few native Paraguayan males). The number of Italian citizens resident in Paraguay in 2019 was about 13,000.

Institutions
One of the institutions founded by Italian immigrants that had particular relevance was the "Società Italiana di Mutuo Soccorso". This body, created on 8 September 1871, had the purpose of assisting Italian citizens who had settled in Paraguay, under the strict sense of solidarity. Currently, in addition to the Società Italiana di Mutuo Soccorso, there are several Italian organizations and associations in Paraguay.

Notable Italian-Paraguayans

 Oberdan Sallustro, Entrepreneur who was kidnapped and assassinated by the Ejército Revolucionario del Pueblo (1915-1972)
 José Patricio Guggiari, President of Paraguay (1928-1931 and 1932)
 Andrea Pedotti, President of Paraguay (1988-1993)
 Juan W. Conti, President of Paraguay (1993-1998)
 Luis Gonzalez Macchi, President of Paraguay (1999-2003)
 Cirilo Antonio Rivarola, provisional President & President of Paraguay (1870-1871)
 Gabriel Casaccia, novelist considered the father of modern Paraguayan literature
 José Bozzano, military engineer and minister of economy
 Giacomo Bertoni, botanist and writer
 Fiorella Migliore, Miss "Italia nel Mondo" 2008
 Gladys Carmagnola, poet and writer
 Víctor Pecci, tennis player
 Silvio Pettirossi, aviation pioneer
 Attila Sallustro, footballer 
 Cayetano Ré, footballer
 Guido Boggiani, writer and explorer
 Maneco Galeano, musician
 Antolín Alcaraz, footballer
 Ana María Baiardi, diplomat and politician
 Carlos Mateo Balmelli, politician, former President of the Senate of Paraguay
 Diego Barreto, footballer
 Jorge Battaglia, footballer
 Juan Manuel Battaglia, footballer
 Salvador Breglia, footballer
 Luis Castiglioni, politician, former Vice President of Paraguay
 Otto Miguel Cione, journalist, dramatist and writer
 Pablo Escobar, footballer
 Paola Ferrari, basketball player
 Carlos Filizzola, politician
 Rafael Filizzola, politician
 Jorge Gattini, agronomist and politician
 Gloria del Paraguay, soprano
 Ronald Huth, footballer
 Paola Maltese, actress, presenter and entrepreneur
 Juan Matto, footballer
 Alfredo Mazacotte, footballer
 David Meza, footballer
 Ricardo Migliorisi, painter, costume designer, scenery designer and architect
 Marcelo Pecci, prosecutor
 Ana Camila Pirelli, track and field athlete
 Robert Piris Da Motta, footballer
 Iván Piris, footballer
 Wilson Pittoni, footballer
 Andrea Quattrocchi, actress and ballerina
 Juan Bautista Rivarola Matto, journalist, narrator, essayist and playwright
 Luis Ruffinelli, playwright, journalist and political activist
 Giannina Rufinelli, model and beauty pageant titleholder
 Miguel Pecci Saavedra, playwright, novelist, literary critic and humanist
 Antony Silva, footballer
 Facunda Speratti, activist who participated in the May 1811 revolution.
 Ricardo Tavarelli, footballer
 Fabrizio Zanotti, golfer

Gallery 
The Festa Italiana ("Italian Feast") in Asunción in 2019:

See also 
 Immigration to Paraguay

References 

European Paraguayan
Paraguay
Immigration to Paraguay

Ethnic groups in Paraguay